The City of London is the historic centre and main financial district of London, England.

City of London may also refer to:

Places and organizations
UK
 City of London (UK Parliament constituency), 1707–1950
 Cities of London and Westminster (UK Parliament constituency), since 1950
 London, the capital city of England and the United Kingdom
 City of London Corporation, the governing body of the City of London, England

Elsewhere
 London, Ontario, Canada
 London, Arkansas, US
 London, Kentucky, US
 London, Ohio, US

Ships
 City of London (ship), several ships, including:
 City of London (1800 Indiaman), a merchant ship
 City of London (1801 ship), a West Indiaman
 SS City of London, a passenger steamship 1863–1881

See also
 City of London Police
 City of London Investment Trust
 City of London Academy (disambiguation), four academies established in inner London
 London (disambiguation)
 History of London